Morrisville is the name of some places in the U.S. state of Pennsylvania:

Morrisville, Bucks County, Pennsylvania, a borough
Morrisville, Greene County, Pennsylvania, a census-designated place

nl:Morrisville (Pennsylvania)